Tunes is a brand of lozenge, manufactured by The Mars Wrigley Company in the United Kingdom. It is marketed as a cough sweet, or anti-congestant lozenge, containing eucalyptus oil and menthol. It is a relative of the now discontinued brand of Spangles, and shares the same packaging and dimensions of that brand. In the United Kingdom, Tunes no longer have the style packaging of Spangles.

There was a memorable television advertising campaign for the product with the slogan "Tunes help you breathe more easily". The commercials featured the actor Peter Cleall, who would perfectly enunciate the word "Tunes" after taking the anti-congestant.

See also
 List of confectionery brands

References 

Mars confectionery brands
Throat lozenges
Wrigley Company brands